Terra Ceia Preserve (also known as Frog Creek and Terra Ceia State Park) is a  preserve located in Manatee County, Florida north of Palmetto. The preserve is maintained and co-owned by Southwest Florida Water Management District (SFWMD) and Florida Department of Environmental Protection (FDEP).

Overview
The initial portion of the state preserve was acquired in 1995 by SFWMD to protect the water quality of Tampa Bay. In 1998, a joint acquisition between SWFMD and the Board of Trustees for the Internal Improvement Trust Fund was done to purchase an additional .

Activities
Park activities include hiking trails, canoe/kayak launches, a boat ramp, and a plan for interpretive kiosks in the future. Kayaking is the primary activity within the preserve. Park admission is free.

References

External links
Terra Ceia Preserve State Park at Florida State Parks

Parks in Manatee County, Florida
Protected areas of Manatee County, Florida
Southwest Florida Water Management District reserves
State parks of Florida
1995 establishments in Florida